Leo Everett Lewis Jr. (February 4, 1933 – August 30, 2013) was an American gridiron football player and coach. He played college football as a running back for Lincoln University in Jefferson City, Missouri from 1951 to 1954 and professionally with the Winnipeg Blue Bombers of the Canadian Football League (CFL) from 1955 to 1966. He served as the head football coach at his alma mater, Lincoln, from 1973 to 1975.

Playing career

College
As a halfback at Lincoln University in Jefferson City, Missouri, Lewis was nicknamed "The Lincoln Locomotive". He set school records for touchdowns in a season (22), touchdowns in a career (64), rushing yards in a season (1,239) and career rushing yards (4,457).

CFL
After a stellar college career, Lewis signed with the Winnipeg Blue Bombers of the Canadian Football League (CFL). He was named All-Pro six times and was a member of four Grey Cup-winning Blue Bombers teams. He missed the 1956 season with a serious ankle injury. During his 11-year career in the CFL, he rushed for 8,861 yards with a 6.6 yard average. He also was a remarkable kick-returner, averaging 29.1 yards on kickoff returns in his CFL career. His career rushing total of 8,861 yards stood as a Winnipeg Blue Bomber record for 41 years until it was passed by Charles Roberts in 2007. His career totals in return yardage, and yards per carry, still stand as Blue Bombers records.

Career regular season rushing statistics

Coaching career
Lewis worked briefly for the United States Department of Agriculture and was an assistant coach at Hickman High School in Hickman High School in Columbia, Missouri. He returned to his alma mater, Lincoln University, in 1968 as an assistant football coach under Dwight T. Reed. Lewis succeeded Reed as head football coach in 1973. He resigned from his post as head football coach in January 1976, after leading the Lincoln Blue Tigers to a record of 12–21 in three seasons.

Lewis also coached golf and was a physical educations instructor at Lincoln. He was the head coach of the women's basketball team from 1981 to 1993, compiling a record of 104–206 in  12 seasons. Lewis later served as the interim athletic director at Lincoln.

Head coaching record

Honors
Lewis was inducted into the Canadian Football Hall of Fame in 1973 and the College Football Hall of Fame in August 2005. In 2005, he was named to 20 All-Time Blue Bombers Greats, to commemorate the 75th anniversary of Blue Bombers franchise. Lewis was inducted into the Manitoba Sports Hall of Fame and Museum in 2005, was inducted into the Black College Football Hall of Fame in February 2018, and the Missouri Sports Hall Of Fame in 2019.

Family and death
Lewis had three children, two of whom played professional football. Leo Lewis III played as a wide receiver for Calgary Stampeders and Hamilton Tiger-Cats of the CFL and the Minnesota Vikings and Cleveland Browns of the National Football League (NFL). Marc Lewis also played as a wide receiver, the for Denver Gold and Oakland Invaders of the United States Football League (USFL)  and the CFL's Ottawa Rough Riders and the Calgary Stampeders and Barry Lewis.

Lewis died on August 30, 2013 at his home in Columbia, Missouri. He had been battling an illness for some time.

Notes

References

External links
 
 

1933 births
2013 deaths
American football halfbacks
American football return specialists
Canadian football running backs
American women's basketball coaches
Lincoln Blue Tigers athletic directors
Lincoln Blue Tigers football coaches
Lincoln Blue Tigers football players
Lincoln Blue Tigers women's basketball coaches
Winnipeg Blue Bombers players
College golf coaches in the United States
Canadian Football Hall of Fame inductees
College Football Hall of Fame inductees
Sportspeople from Des Moines, Iowa
Coaches of American football from Iowa
Players of American football from Des Moines, Iowa
African-American college athletic directors in the United States
African-American coaches of American football
African-American players of American football
African-American players of Canadian football
African-American basketball coaches
20th-century African-American sportspeople
21st-century African-American people